The 2nd constituency of the Hautes-Pyrénées (French: Deuxième circonscription des Hautes-Pyrénées) is a French legislative constituency in the Hautes-Pyrénées département. Like the other 576 French constituencies, it elects one MP using a two round electoral system.

Description

The 2nd constituency of Hautes-Pyrénées covers the west of the department including part of Tarbes, the rest being in Hautes-Pyrénées's 1st constituency.

In recent decades the constituency has with the exception of between 1993 and 2002 been represented by a deputy from the PRG which generally supports the Socialist Party.

Assembly Members

Election results

2022 

 
 
 
 
 
 
 
 
|-
| colspan="8" bgcolor="#E9E9E9"|
|-

2017

|- style="background-color:#E9E9E9;text-align:center;"
! colspan="2" rowspan="2" style="text-align:left;" | Candidate
! rowspan="2" colspan="2" style="text-align:left;" | Party
! colspan="2" | 1st round
! colspan="2" | 2nd round
|- style="background-color:#E9E9E9;text-align:center;"
! width="75" | Votes
! width="30" | %
! width="75" | Votes
! width="30" | %
|-
| style="background-color:" |
| style="text-align:left;" | Marie-Agnès Staricky
| style="text-align:left;" | La République En Marche!
| LREM
| 
| 32.16
| 
| 48.91
|-
| style="background-color:" |
| style="text-align:left;" | Jeanine Dubié
| style="text-align:left;" | Radical Party of the Left
| PRG
| 
| 16.53
| 
| 51.09
|-
| style="background-color:" |
| style="text-align:left;" | Clément Menet
| style="text-align:left;" | The Republicans
| LR
| 
| 14.16
| colspan="2" style="text-align:left;" |
|-
| style="background-color:" |
| style="text-align:left;" | Charles Rocheteau
| style="text-align:left;" | La France Insoumise
| FI
| 
| 13.92
| colspan="2" style="text-align:left;" |
|-
| style="background-color:" |
| style="text-align:left;" | Olivier Monteil
| style="text-align:left;" | National Front
| FN
| 
| 11.09
| colspan="2" style="text-align:left;" |
|-
| style="background-color:" |
| style="text-align:left;" | Marie-Pierre Vieu
| style="text-align:left;" | Communist Party
| PCF
| 
| 4.81
| colspan="2" style="text-align:left;" |
|-
| style="background-color:" |
| style="text-align:left;" | Cécile Bourdeu D’Aguerre
| style="text-align:left;" | Ecologist
| ECO
| 
| 2.54
| colspan="2" style="text-align:left;" |
|-
| style="background-color:" |
| style="text-align:left;" | Pauline Bach-Lapize
| style="text-align:left;" | Debout la France
| DLF
| 
| 1.55
| colspan="2" style="text-align:left;" |
|-
| style="background-color:" |
| style="text-align:left;" | Sabrina Verdier
| style="text-align:left;" | Independent
| DIV
| 
| 1.07
| colspan="2" style="text-align:left;" |
|-
| style="background-color:" |
| style="text-align:left;" | François Meunier
| style="text-align:left;" | Far Left
| EXG
| 
| 0.83
| colspan="2" style="text-align:left;" |
|-
| style="background-color:" |
| style="text-align:left;" | Albert Danjau
| style="text-align:left;" | Ecologist
| ECO
| 
| 0.83
| colspan="2" style="text-align:left;" |
|-
| style="background-color:" |
| style="text-align:left;" | Nathalie Volpe Fatmi
| style="text-align:left;" | Independent
| DIV
| 
| 0.50
| colspan="2" style="text-align:left;" |
|-
| colspan="8" style="background-color:#E9E9E9;"|
|- style="font-weight:bold"
| colspan="4" style="text-align:left;" | Total
| 
| 100%
| 
| 100%
|-
| colspan="8" style="background-color:#E9E9E9;"|
|-
| colspan="4" style="text-align:left;" | Registered voters
| 
| style="background-color:#E9E9E9;"|
| 
| style="background-color:#E9E9E9;"|
|-
| colspan="4" style="text-align:left;" | Blank/Void ballots
| 
| 2.62%
| 
| 12.87%
|-
| colspan="4" style="text-align:left;" | Turnout
| 
| 52.94%
| 
| 45.85%
|-
| colspan="4" style="text-align:left;" | Abstentions
| 
| 47.06%
| 
| 54.15%
|-
| colspan="8" style="background-color:#E9E9E9;"|
|- style="font-weight:bold"
| colspan="6" style="text-align:left;" | Result
| colspan="2" style="background-color:" | PRG HOLD
|}

2012

|- style="background-color:#E9E9E9;text-align:center;"
! colspan="2" rowspan="2" style="text-align:left;" | Candidate
! rowspan="2" colspan="2" style="text-align:left;" | Party
! colspan="2" | 1st round
! colspan="2" | 2nd round
|- style="background-color:#E9E9E9;text-align:center;"
! width="75" | Votes
! width="30" | %
! width="75" | Votes
! width="30" | %
|-
| style="background-color:" |
| style="text-align:left;" | Jeanine Dubie
| style="text-align:left;" | Radical Party of the Left
| PRG
| 
| 42.63
| 
| 64.74
|-
| style="background-color:" |
| style="text-align:left;" | Jean-Pierre Artiganave
| style="text-align:left;" | Union for a Popular Movement
| UMP
| 
| 13,720
| 
| 35.26
|-
| style="background-color:" |
| style="text-align:left;" | Marie-Pierre Vieu
| style="text-align:left;" | Left Front
| FG
| 
| 12.63
| colspan="2" style="text-align:left;" |
|-
| style="background-color:" |
| style="text-align:left;" | Philippe Manusset
| style="text-align:left;" | National Front
| FN
| 
| 10.61
| colspan="2" style="text-align:left;" |
|-
| style="background-color:" |
| style="text-align:left;" | Marie-Laure Bondon
| style="text-align:left;" | Europe Ecology - The Greens
| EELV
| 
| 2.67
| colspan="2" style="text-align:left;" |
|-
| style="background-color:" |
| style="text-align:left;" | Jean-Pierre Auguet
| style="text-align:left;" | The Centre for France
| CEN
| 
| 2.45
| colspan="2" style="text-align:left;" |
|-
| style="background-color:" |
| style="text-align:left;" | Albert Danjau
| style="text-align:left;" | Ecologist
| ECO
| 
| 0.88
| colspan="2" style="text-align:left;" |
|-
| style="background-color:" |
| style="text-align:left;" | Christian Zueras
| style="text-align:left;" | Far Left
| EXG
| 
| 0.79
| colspan="2" style="text-align:left;" |
|-
| style="background-color:" |
| style="text-align:left;" | François Meunier
| style="text-align:left;" | Far Left
| EXG
| 
| 0.57
| colspan="2" style="text-align:left;" |
|-
| style="background-color:" |
| style="text-align:left;" | Andrée Chenauad
| style="text-align:left;" | Miscellaneous Right
| DVD
| 
| 0.56
| colspan="2" style="text-align:left;" |
|-
| style="background-color:" |
| style="text-align:left;" | Marie-Claude Bosc
| style="text-align:left;" | Miscellaneous Right
| DVD
| 
| 0.48
| colspan="2" style="text-align:left;" |
|-
| colspan="8" style="background-color:#E9E9E9;"|
|- style="font-weight:bold"
| colspan="4" style="text-align:left;" | Total
| 
| 100%
| 
| 100%
|-
| colspan="8" style="background-color:#E9E9E9;"|
|-
| colspan="4" style="text-align:left;" | Registered voters
| 
| style="background-color:#E9E9E9;"|
| 
| style="background-color:#E9E9E9;"|
|-
| colspan="4" style="text-align:left;" | Blank/Void ballots
| 
| 2.02%
| 
| 4.51%
|-
| colspan="4" style="text-align:left;" | Turnout
| 
| 61.17%
| 
| 58.91%
|-
| colspan="4" style="text-align:left;" | Abstentions
| 
| 38.83%
| 
| 41.09%
|-
| colspan="8" style="background-color:#E9E9E9;"|
|- style="font-weight:bold"
| colspan="6" style="text-align:left;" | Result
| colspan="2" style="background-color:" | PRG HOLD
|}

2007

|- style="background-color:#E9E9E9;text-align:center;"
! colspan="2" rowspan="2" style="text-align:left;" | Candidate
! rowspan="2" colspan="2" style="text-align:left;" | Party
! colspan="2" | 1st round
! colspan="2" | 2nd round
|- style="background-color:#E9E9E9;text-align:center;"
! width="75" | Votes
! width="30" | %
! width="75" | Votes
! width="30" | %
|-
| style="background-color:" |
| style="text-align:left;" | Chantal Robin-Rodrigo
| style="text-align:left;" | Radical Party of the Left
| PRG
| 
| 39.78
| 
| 55.17
|-
| style="background-color:" |
| style="text-align:left;" | Gérard Tremege
| style="text-align:left;" | Union for a Popular Movement
| UMP
| 
| 38.16
| 
| 44.83
|-
| style="background-color:" |
| style="text-align:left;" | Jean Casteran
| style="text-align:left;" | UDF-Democratic Movement
| UDF-MoDem
| 
| 8.81
| colspan="2" style="text-align:left;" |
|-
| style="background-color:" |
| style="text-align:left;" | Carole Barbe
| style="text-align:left;" | Communist Party
| PCF
| 
| 3.05
| colspan="2" style="text-align:left;" |
|-
| style="background-color:" |
| style="text-align:left;" | Christian Zueras
| style="text-align:left;" | Far Left
| EXG
| 
| 2.72
| colspan="2" style="text-align:left;" |
|-
| style="background-color:" |
| style="text-align:left;" | Nicole Laborde
| style="text-align:left;" | National Front
| FN
| 
| 2.69
| colspan="2" style="text-align:left;" |
|-
| style="background-color:" |
| style="text-align:left;" | Michèle Gaspalou
| style="text-align:left;" | The Greens
| LV
| 
| 1.74
| colspan="2" style="text-align:left;" |
|-
| style="background-color:" |
| style="text-align:left;" | Albert Danjau
| style="text-align:left;" | Ecologist
| ECO
| 
| 1.32
| colspan="2" style="text-align:left;" |
|-
| style="background-color:" |
| style="text-align:left;" | François Meunier
| style="text-align:left;" | Far Left
| EXG
| 
| 0.68
| colspan="2" style="text-align:left;" |
|-
| style="background-color:" |
| style="text-align:left;" | Robert Romanelli
| style="text-align:left;" | Independent
| DIV
| 
| 0.63
| colspan="2" style="text-align:left;" |
|-
| style="background-color:" |
| style="text-align:left;" | Dominique Fevre
| style="text-align:left;" | Far Right
| EXD
| 
| 0.41
| colspan="2" style="text-align:left;" |
|-
| style="background-color:" |
| style="text-align:left;" | Brahim El Batbouti
| style="text-align:left;" | Miscellaneous Left
| DVG
| 
| 0.00
| colspan="2" style="text-align:left;" |
|-
| colspan="8" style="background-color:#E9E9E9;"|
|- style="font-weight:bold"
| colspan="4" style="text-align:left;" | Total
| 
| 100%
| 
| 100%
|-
| colspan="8" style="background-color:#E9E9E9;"|
|-
| colspan="4" style="text-align:left;" | Registered voters
| 
| style="background-color:#E9E9E9;"|
| 
| style="background-color:#E9E9E9;"|
|-
| colspan="4" style="text-align:left;" | Blank/Void ballots
| 
| 2.02%
| 
| 2.99%
|-
| colspan="4" style="text-align:left;" | Turnout
| 
| 66.48%
| 
| 68.22%
|-
| colspan="4" style="text-align:left;" | Abstentions
| 
| 33.52%
| 
| 31.78%
|-
| colspan="8" style="background-color:#E9E9E9;"|
|- style="font-weight:bold"
| colspan="6" style="text-align:left;" | Result
| colspan="2" style="background-color:" | PRG HOLD
|}

2002

|- style="background-color:#E9E9E9;text-align:center;"
! colspan="2" rowspan="2" style="text-align:left;" | Candidate
! rowspan="2" colspan="2" style="text-align:left;" | Party
! colspan="2" | 1st round
! colspan="2" | 2nd round
|- style="background-color:#E9E9E9;text-align:center;"
! width="75" | Votes
! width="30" | %
! width="75" | Votes
! width="30" | %
|-
| style="background-color:" |
| style="text-align:left;" | Gerard Tremege
| style="text-align:left;" | Union for a Presidential Majority
| UMP
| 
| 39.75
| 
| 48.49
|-
| style="background-color:" |
| style="text-align:left;" | M. Chantal Robin-Rodrigo
| style="text-align:left;" | Radical Party of the Left
| PRG
| 
| 37.24
| 
| 51.51
|-
| style="background-color:" |
| style="text-align:left;" | Pierre Rey
| style="text-align:left;" | National Front
| FN
| 
| 7.21
| colspan="2" style="text-align:left;" |
|-
| style="background-color:" |
| style="text-align:left;" | Elisabeth Carrere
| style="text-align:left;" | Communist Party
| PCF
| 
| 3.87
| colspan="2" style="text-align:left;" |
|-
| style="background-color:" |
| style="text-align:left;" | Micheline Dallier
| style="text-align:left;" | Hunting, Fishing, Nature and Traditions
| CPNT
| 
| 3.55
| colspan="2" style="text-align:left;" |
|-
| style="background-color:" |
| style="text-align:left;" | Christian Agius
| style="text-align:left;" | The Greens
| LV
| 
| 2.86
| colspan="2" style="text-align:left;" |
|-
| style="background-color:" |
| style="text-align:left;" | Christian Zueras
| style="text-align:left;" | Revolutionary Communist League
| LCR
| 
| 1.98
| colspan="2" style="text-align:left;" |
|-
| style="background-color:" |
| style="text-align:left;" | François Meunier
| style="text-align:left;" | Workers’ Struggle
| LO
| 
| 1.11
| colspan="2" style="text-align:left;" |
|-
| style="background-color:" |
| style="text-align:left;" | Albert Danjau
| style="text-align:left;" | Ecologist
| ECO
| 
| 0.75
| colspan="2" style="text-align:left;" |
|-
| style="background-color:" |
| style="text-align:left;" | Michel Aguillon
| style="text-align:left;" | Independent
| DIV
| 
| 0.70
| colspan="2" style="text-align:left;" |
|-
| style="background-color:" |
| style="text-align:left;" | Ingrid Wuster
| style="text-align:left;" | National Republican Movement
| MNR
| 
| 0.41
| colspan="2" style="text-align:left;" |
|-
| style="background-color:" |
| style="text-align:left;" | Emmanuel Hornus
| style="text-align:left;" | Ecologist
| ECO
| 
| 0.39
| colspan="2" style="text-align:left;" |
|-
| style="background-color:" |
| style="text-align:left;" | Lionel Cazeaux
| style="text-align:left;" | Independent
| DIV
| 
| 0.16
| colspan="2" style="text-align:left;" |
|-
| colspan="8" style="background-color:#E9E9E9;"|
|- style="font-weight:bold"
| colspan="4" style="text-align:left;" | Total
| 
| 100%
| 
| 100%
|-
| colspan="8" style="background-color:#E9E9E9;"|
|-
| colspan="4" style="text-align:left;" | Registered voters
| 
| style="background-color:#E9E9E9;"|
| 
| style="background-color:#E9E9E9;"|
|-
| colspan="4" style="text-align:left;" | Blank/Void ballots
| 
| 2.70%
| 
| 3.92%
|-
| colspan="4" style="text-align:left;" | Turnout
| 
| 70.07%
| 
| 69.24%
|-
| colspan="4" style="text-align:left;" | Abstentions
| 
| 29.93%
| 
| 30.76%
|-
| colspan="8" style="background-color:#E9E9E9;"|
|- style="font-weight:bold"
| colspan="6" style="text-align:left;" | Result
| colspan="2" style="background-color:" | PRG GAIN FROM UDF
|}

References

2